Eshaan Ravi (born 19 May 1993) is an Indian cricketer. He made his List A debut for Bihar in the 2018–19 Vijay Hazare Trophy on 30 September 2018. He made his Twenty20 debut on 11 November 2019, for Bihar in the 2019–20 Syed Mushtaq Ali Trophy.

References

External links
 

1993 births
Living people
Indian cricketers
Bihar cricketers
Place of birth missing (living people)